This is a list of notable synagogues in Ethiopia.

Addis Ababa

Bet Selam (House of Peace) Synagogue, Kechene (Beta Abraham)
Jewish Center - Chabad Ethiopia (Hasidic)
Jewish Sinagog Association (Beta Israel)
Succat Rahamim Synagogue (Adenite/Yemenite)

Ambober
Ambober Synagogue (Beta Israel)

Gondar
HaTikvah Synagogue (Beta Israel)

Wolleka
Wolleka Synagogue (Beta Israel)

See also
Beta Abraham
Beta Israel
History of the Jews in Ethiopia

References

External links

Ethiopia, Sub-Saharan African Synagogues

Ethiopia
 
Synagogues